Le Courrier graphique. Revue des arts graphiques was a twentieth century French magazine of the graphic arts published in Paris. It was first published in 1936 and ceased with edition number 118 in 1962. It was produced under the direction of Albert Cymboliste and the editor-in-chief was Pierre Mornand.

References and sources
References

Sources
French VII Bibliography: Bibliography of Critical and Biographical References for the Study of Contemporary French Literature. Modern Language Association of America. Bibliography Committee for French VII (Contemporary Literature), French Institute in the United States, Associated University Press, 1949.

1936 establishments in France
1962 disestablishments in France
Defunct magazines published in France
French-language magazines
Magazines established in 1936
Magazines disestablished in 1962
Magazines published in Paris
French art publications